James Walter Gladd (October 2, 1922 – November 8, 1977) was an American professional baseball catcher who played in four games in the major leagues for the New York Giants in .

Gladd entered minor league baseball in 1940. After three seasons, he joined the United States Army for World War II military service. Commissioned a second lieutenant in June 1943, he was assigned to the 33rd Field Artillery Battalion of the First Infantry Division—the "Big Red One"—which saw combat in the North African Campaign, the Invasion of Sicily, and the European Theatre.

Gladd returned to baseball in 1946, and after 50 games with the Triple-A Jersey City Giants, he was recalled to New York for a September MLB audition. Starting four games between September 9 and 29, he collected his only hit, a single off Dick Koecher of the Philadelphia Phillies, in his fourth and final contest. 

Although he never again reached the majors, Gladd continued his active career at the highest levels of the minors, playing eight seasons in the Pacific Coast League. He retired from the game in 1955 and died at age 55 in Long Beach, California, on November 8, 1977.

References

External links

1922 births
1977 deaths
Baseball players from Oklahoma
Fort Smith Giants players
Hollywood Stars players
Jersey City Giants players
Major League Baseball catchers
New York Giants (NL) players
People from Fort Gibson, Oklahoma
Portland Beavers players
Salisbury Giants players
San Diego Padres (minor league) players
San Francisco Seals (baseball) players
United States Army personnel of World War II